USS Pinellas (AK-202) was an  that was constructed for the U.S. Navy during the closing period of World War II. By the time she was scheduled for commissioning, the war's end caused her to be declared "excess to needs" and she was returned to the U.S. Government and struck by the Navy.

Construction
Pinellas was laid down under Maritime Commission contract, MC hull 2156, by Globe Shipbuilding Co., Superior, Wisconsin. She was transferred to the Navy in March 1945. Pinellas was scheduled for commissioning. However, because of the Allied victory in the Pacific Ocean theatre of operations, her commissioning was cancelled.

Merchant service
Pinellas was ordered returned to the US Maritime Commission for disposal. Her name subsequently reverted Coastal Stevedore.
Merchant Service A. H. Bull Steamship Company starting 3 December 1945, at New Orleans. Operated under a charter to Bull Insular Lines starting 5 July 1946. Operated by A. L. Burbank & Company, starting 12 February 1947, at New York. 
Coastal Stevedor was old to the government of Cuba.
On 1 January 1948, she was sold to Cuba. She was scrapped in 1980.

Notes 

Citations

Bibliography 

Online resources

External links

 

Alamosa-class cargo ships
Ships built in Superior, Wisconsin
1944 ships
World War II auxiliary ships of the United States
Pinellas County, Florida